Maja Aleksić (born 6 June 1997, Užice) is a Serbian volleyball player who plays as a middle blocker. She is currently a member of Serbian women's national volleyball team.

She competed in the 2018 FIVB Volleyball Women's Nations League, 2018 FIVB Volleyball Women's World Championship, 2019 FIVB Volleyball Women's Nations League, and 2019 FIVB Volleyball Women's World Cup.

She was part of the Serbia women's national volleyball team at the 2020 Tokyo Summer Olympics, where she won a bronze medal. With the national team, she also won the bronze medal at 2022 FIVB Volleyball Women's Nations League.

References 

Living people
1997 births
Sportspeople from Užice
Serbian women's volleyball players
Middle blockers
Volleyball players at the 2020 Summer Olympics
Olympic volleyball players of Serbia
Medalists at the 2020 Summer Olympics
Olympic bronze medalists for Serbia
Olympic medalists in volleyball
21st-century Serbian women